The 2019–20 Virginia Cavaliers women's basketball team represented the University of Virginia during the 2019–20 NCAA Division I women's basketball season. The Cavaliers were led by second year head coach Tina Thompson, and played their home games at John Paul Jones Arena as members the Atlantic Coast Conference.

The Cavaliers finished the season 13–17 and 8–10 in ACC play to finish in ninth place.  As the ninth seed in the ACC tournament, they lost to Syracuse in Second Round.  The NCAA tournament and WNIT were cancelled due to the COVID-19 outbreak.

Previous season
The 2018–19 Cavaliers finished the season 12–19, 5–11 in ACC play to finish in a twelfth place. They advanced to the second round of the ACC women's tournament where they lost to Syracuse. They did not qualify for post season play.

Recruiting Class

Source:

Roster

Schedule

Source:

|-
!colspan=9 style="background:#00214E; color:#F56D22;"|Non-conference regular season

|-
!colspan=9 style="background:#00214E; color:#F56D22;"|ACC regular season

|-
!colspan=9 style="background:#00214E; color:#F56D22;"| ACC Women's Tournament

Rankings

See also
 2019–20 Virginia Cavaliers men's basketball team

References

Virginia Cavaliers women's basketball seasons
Virginia